WTJX-TV, virtual channel 12 (UHF digital channel 36), is a Public Broadcasting Service (PBS) member television station serving the United States Virgin Islands that is licensed to Charlotte Amalie, Saint Thomas. Owned by the Virgin Islands Public Broadcasting System, it is sister to National Public Radio (NPR) member station WTJX-FM (93.1 MHz). The two stations share studios on Haypiece Hill in Charlotte Amalie; WTJX-TV's transmitter is located on Signal Hill.

WTJX-TV also operates a translator facility in Christiansted on Saint Croix: W05AW-D on VHF channel 5. In July 2007, WTJX St. Croix moved to a larger facility, with a full studio, control room, and editing bays.

The station has also created its own mascot, "Langford the Lizard", primarily displayed on their website.

Digital channels
The station's digital signal is multiplexed:

References

External links

TJX-TV
PBS member stations
Television channels and stations established in 1972
1972 establishments in the United States Virgin Islands
Charlotte Amalie, U.S. Virgin Islands
Public broadcasting in insular areas of the United States